The Brand of Hate is a 1934 American Western film directed by Lewis D. Collins and starring Bob Steele, Lucile Browne and William Farnum.

Cast
Bob Steele as Rod Camp 
Lucile Browne as Margie Larkins 
William Farnum as Joe Larkins 
Mickey Rentschler as Bud Larkins 
George 'Gabby' Hayes as Bill Larkins 
James Flavin as Holt Larkins 
Archie Ricks] as Slim Larkins 
Charles K. French as Mr. Camp 
Jack Rockwell as Sheriff Bailey 
Rose Plumer as Mrs. Camp 
Blackie Whiteford as Camp Ranch Hand 
Bill Patton as Camp Ranch Hand

References

External links

1934 Western (genre) films
American Western (genre) films
Films directed by Lewis D. Collins
American black-and-white films
1930s American films